The , officially known as the Kangla Fort, is an old fortified palace at Imphal in the Manipur state of India. It was formerly situated on both sides (western and eastern) of the bank of the Imphal River, now remaining only on the western side in ruined conditions. Kangla means "the prominent part of the dry land" in old Meetei. It was the traditional seat of the past Meetei rulers of Manipur.

Kangla (Imphal) was the ancient capital of pre-modern Manipur.
The Kangla is a revered spot for the people of Manipur, reminding them of the days of their independence. It is a sacred place to the Meiteis.

The Kangla is being proposed to be declared as a UNESCO World Heritage Site, for which there are discussions ongoing in the Indian Parliament.

History 

The Kangla was the seat of administration of the Meitei rulers of the Ningthouja dynasty (33 CE to 1891 CE).

Flora and fauna 

The Kangla possesses a sobriquet, "Lungs of Imphal" as it is heavily forested, providing oxygen at a massive level in the heart of the metropolis of Manipur.
Unfortunately, due to some developmental construction activities in the last few years, some minor but significant deforestation occurred inside the Kangla.

In the year 2009, the Kangla Herbal Garden was set up by the Kangla Fort Board, in order to carry out the plan of planting medicinal plants inside the Kangla into action. The responsibility for bringing up the botanical garden was held by the Lamphel based sub-branch of the North East Institute of Science and Technology, Jorhat (NEIST).
It planted around 131 different plants, (including around 20 medicinal plant species) in the garden. Notable plant species nurtured in the Kangla Herbal Garden include "heigru", "kihori", agar (Aquilaria agallocha Lamp), neem (Azadirachta indica A Zuss), tera, singairei and leihao. An area covering 3.5 acres of land was allocated for the development of the botanical garden by the Manipur Government.

During the month of September in 2019, around 120 trees, including mayokfa, agar, uningthou, teak, chahui and samba, were planted inside the Kangla by the editorial board and the management team of "The Sangai Express" (TSE), a newspaper daily of Manipur, on its 20th foundation day. 

There's another garden named "Engellei Leikol" (formerly known as "Rock Garden" of the Kangla) located in the southern part of the Kangla.  

During the month of May in 2022, around 50 fruit-bearing plants were planted inside the Kangla by the Institute of Bioresources and Sustainable Development (IBSD).

There's a plan for planting 10,000 saplings of fruit bearing trees inside the Kangla by the Kangla Fort Board, under the leadership of Nongthombam Biren, the Chief Minister of Manipur.

Places

See also 
 Kangla Nongpok Torban
 Museums in Kangla

Notes

References

External links

 Kangla Fort at Imphal Free Press
The ancient capital of Manipur : E-Pao.Net
 Rediscovering a heritage- By SUSHANTA TALUKDAR
 Kangla Fort Beautiful Photos - KanglaOnline.com

Meitei architecture
Ancient archaeological sites
Ancient cities
Ancient peoples
Ancient culture 
Archaeological monuments in India
Archaeological sites in India
British India
Buildings and structures in Imphal
Cultural heritage of India 
Cultural history of India
Historical regions
Imphal West district
Indian Army bases 
Former capital cities in India
Forts in India
Kangla
Landmarks in India 
Meitei culture 
Meitei pilgrimage sites 
Military installations of India
Monuments and memorials in Imphal 
Monuments and memorials in India 
Monuments and memorials in Manipur 
Monuments and memorials to Meitei people 
Monuments and memorials to Meitei royalties 
Palaces in Manipur
Public art in India  
Religious places
Royal residences in India
Tourist attractions in Manipur